Northville is a town in Spink County, South Dakota, United States. The population was 139 at the 2020 census.

History
Northville was platted in 1881 when the railroad was extended to that point. The city was named from the fact it was then the most northern point on the railroad line. A post office has been in operation in Northville since 1881.

Geography

Northville is located at  (45.156076, -98.578749).

Northville has been assigned the ZIP code 57465 and the FIPS place code 45740.

Demographics

2010 census
As of the census of 2010, there were 143 people, 52 households, and 37 families residing in the town. The racial makeup of the town was 97.2% White, 2.1% Native American, and 0.7% from two or more races. Hispanic or Latino of any race were 0.7% of the population.

There were 52 households, of which 34.6% had children under the age of 18 living with them, 67.3% were married couples living together, 1.9% had a female householder with no husband present, 1.9% had a male householder with no wife present, and 28.8% were non-families. 25.0% of all households were made up of individuals, and 5.7% had someone living alone who was 65 years of age or older. The average household size was 2.75 and the average family size was 3.38.

The median age in the town was 31.8 years. 36.4% of residents were under the age of 18; 2.1% were between the ages of 18 and 24; 30.1% were from 25 to 44; 21.7% were from 45 to 64; and 9.8% were 65 years of age or older. The gender makeup of the town was 44.8% male and 55.2% female.

2000 census
As of the census of 2000, there were 124 people, 47 households, and 33 families residing in the town. The population density was 324.5 people per square mile (126.0/km2). There were 51 housing units at an average density of 133.5 per square mile (51.8/km2). The racial makeup of the town was 99.19% White and 0.81% Native American. Hispanic or Latino of any race were 4.03% of the population.

There were 47 households, out of which 40.4% had children under the age of 18 living with them, 68.1% were married couples living together, 2.1% had a female householder with no husband present, and 27.7% were non-families. 23.4% of all households were made up of individuals, and 12.8% had someone living alone who was 65 years of age or older. The average household size was 2.64 and the average family size was 3.21.

In the town, the population was spread out, with 33.1% under the age of 18, 2.4% from 18 to 24, 25.8% from 25 to 44, 20.2% from 45 to 64, and 18.5% who were 65 years of age or older. The median age was 37 years. For every 100 females, there were 103.3 males. For every 100 females age 18 and over, there were 102.4 males.

The median income for a household in the town was $38,250, and the median income for a family was $41,250. Males had a median income of $23,750 versus $21,875 for females. The per capita income for the town was $14,140. There were 6.7% of families and 9.1% of the population living below the poverty line, including 7.8% of under eighteens and 16.7% of those over 64.

References

Towns in Spink County, South Dakota
Towns in South Dakota